The Private Ear (play) is a 1962 play by Peter Shaffer.
The Private Ear is also an episode of The Brady Bunch